Wisse Alfred Pierre Smit (6 December 1903, in Heumen, Gelderland – 20 June 1986) was a poet and an influential Dutch literary historian. He was a specialist in Dutch literature of the Golden Age (17th century).

W.A.P. Smit worked as a teacher for 17 years, before he accepted a professorship in Dutch literature at the University of Utrecht in 1945. He published various works of poetry  and editions of a number of 16th and 17th century Dutch poets. He gained academic renown with a number of studies on various aspects of 17th century Dutch literature. Through his publications and his guidance to doctoral students, he had a considerable influence on the development of Dutch literary history in the 20th century.

In 1958 he became member of the Royal Netherlands Academy of Arts and Sciences.

References

External links 
Biography W.A.P. Smit 

1903 births
1986 deaths
People from Heumen
Dutch male poets
Dutch literary historians
Members of the Royal Netherlands Academy of Arts and Sciences
Academic staff of Utrecht University
20th-century Dutch poets
20th-century Dutch male writers
20th-century Dutch historians